Live at The Moore is a live album and concert film featuring the final live performance by the American rock supergroup Mad Season. It was originally released on VHS August 29, 1995.

Overview
It was recorded live at the Moore Theatre in Seattle, Washington on April 29, 1995. The version of "November Hotel" played live was renamed "Black Mirror". Allmusic gave it two and a half out of a possible five stars. Live at the Moore was originally released on VHS only, but the full CD audio set of the band's performance and the first official  DVD release of "Live at the Moore" was packaged with the 2013 expanded deluxe edition of their album Above. A separate vinyl version was released as well.

Also included is footage of the band's performance of "Lifeless Dead" from Pearl Jam's January 8, 1995 Self-Pollution satellite radio broadcast, a four-and-a-half-hour-long pirate broadcast out of Seattle which was available to any radio stations that wanted to carry it. "Lifeless Dead" is one of two songs that Mad Season played on the radio broadcast, along with "I Don't Know Anything", however "I Don't Know Anything" has only circulated as an audio recording. Additionally, the video for "River of Deceit" is featured as well. On April 30, 2019, Vevo released a music video on YouTube for "I Don't Know Anything".

Track listing

Original 1995 release

2013 Deluxe Issue
CD 2: Live at the Moore audio (stereo mix)

DVD Video

Bonus Live at The Moore footage

Live at RKCNDY

Self-Pollution Radio

Music Video

Reissue
Live at the Moore was included with the 2013 deluxe reissue of Above.  It includes the audio from the performance, the original VHS content plus bonus footage, including the rest of the live set, Live at RKCNDY, Self-Pollution Radio, and the music video for River of Deceit.

Personnel
Mad Season
Barrett Martin – drums, percussion, marimba
Mike McCready – lead guitar, double bass
John Baker Saunders – bass guitar
Layne Staley – vocals, guitar

Additional musicians and production
Brett Eliason – recording, mixing
Mark Lanegan – vocals on "Long Gone Day"
Lisa Levine – executive production
Duncan Sharp – direction
Skerik (Nalgas Sin Carne) – saxophone on "I Don't Wanna Be a Soldier" and "Long Gone Day"
Colin Stacey – production

Sales chart positions

References

External links

Mad Season (band) video albums
1995 video albums
1995 live albums
Live video albums
Albums recorded at the Moore Theatre